Ayala Center Cebu is a large shopping mall owned by Ayala Malls at the Cebu Business Park in Cebu City, Philippines. It is the first Ayala mall located outside of Metro Manila. It opened in November 1994, one year after their rival mall, SM City Cebu opened. For more than 20 years, it was the only Ayala Mall to bear the word Ayala in its name until Ayala Malls Serin opened in March 2015.

On an average day, more than 85,000 people visit Ayala Center Cebu, with the figure increasing to 135,000 on weekends. It is the centerpiece of the Cebu Business Park Complex.

Development
On October 30, 2008, Ayala Center Cebu opened "The Terraces", a 600-million project which converted the mall's lagoon area into a food, restaurant and beverage mall extension.

The mall also added over 200 stores in its four-level retail expansion plus a condominium called the Park Point Residences. Forty of the 200 outlets opened on December 11, 2013 during the unveiling of the expansion. The 2.9 billion expansion completes the retail master plan of Ayala Center, with an additional  of gross leasable area.

In 2015, a new office building, called The Ayala Center Cebu Tower, was opened on top of the West entrance of the mall. It accommodates business process outsourcing (BPO) offices, and on its podium is a store of fashion retailer H&M.

In 2016, another condominium in the complex, named The Alcoves, was launched. It was built at the original main entrance of the mall. A three-level expansion of the South entrance serves as the podium of the building. The expansion mall part of The Alcoves was completed in April 2021.

Awards
Finalist, Best Shopping Center of the Year (Philippine Retailer's Association and Department of Trade and Industry, 2002)

Incidents

Cinema 5 ceiling collapse
On June 15, 2015, the ceiling at the mall's Cinema 5 collapsed at around 8:50 pm, during a launching event of a BPO company. A piping problem in the cinema's sprinkler system had caused the collapse. It is also believed that an earthquake that struck the area last March had caused the piping problem. Nine people were reported wounded.

Metro Department Store fire
On January 5, 2018, a fire broke out at the Metro Ayala Department Store building. The fire reportedly started at the mall's toy stockroom, located at the third floor of the Metro Ayala building. It took two days to completely extinguish the fire. Despite the damages, no injuries were reported, as the fire started outside of the business hours. The building suffered large damages and the fire rendered the whole Metro Ayala building unsuitable for continued use. Soon, the reconstruction of a new Metro Department Store was commenced 6 months later.

In December 2018, the supermarket opened on its original location, on a  area, on the ground floor of the main mall. In October 2019, the department store also reopened on a temporary location inside the main mall. Plans are underway to rebuild the Metro Department Store building, with the whole structure expected to be complete by the 1st quarter of 2021.

See also
Ayala Malls Central Bloc
SM City Cebu
SM City Consolacion
SM Seaside City Cebu

References

External links
Ayala Center Cebu Official website

Shopping malls in Cebu City
Shopping malls established in 1994
Ayala Malls
Buildings and structures in Cebu City